Qaleh-ye Bala or Qaleh-e Bala or Qaleh Bala or Qalehbala (meaning "Upper Castle") may refer to:
 Qaleh-ye Bala, East Azerbaijan, Iran
 Qaleh-ye Bala, Bostanabad, East Azerbaijan Province, Iran
 Qaleh-ye Bala, Fars
 Qaleh-ye Bala, Isfahan
 Farahabad, Kashmar, in Razavi Khorasan Province, Iran
 Qaleh-ye Bala, Kerman, in Bam County, Kerman Province, Iran
 Qaleh-ye Bala, Semnan, in Shahrud County, Semnan Province, Iran
 Hesar-e Shalpush, in Tehran Province, Iran
 Qaleh Bala, Tehran, in Tehran Province, Iran
 Saruqi, in Markazi Province, Iran
 Qaleh-ye Bala, Yazd